Phạm Như Thảo (born 30 May 1996) is a badminton player from Vietnam. She won her first senior title at the 2014 Vietnam International Series in the mixed doubles event. At the 2015 Eurasia Bulgaria International, Phạm  clinched two titles in the women's and mixed doubles event. Phạm won the BWF Grand Prix tournament, at the 2016 Canada Open with her current partner in mixed doubles Đỗ Tuấn Đức.

Achievements

BWF Grand Prix 
The BWF Grand Prix had two levels, the Grand Prix and Grand Prix Gold. It was a series of badminton tournaments sanctioned by the Badminton World Federation (BWF) and played between 2007 and 2017.

Mixed doubles

  BWF Grand Prix Gold tournament
  BWF Grand Prix tournament

BWF International Challenge/Series 
Women's doubles

Mixed doubles

  BWF International Challenge tournament
  BWF International Series tournament
  BWF Future Series tournament

References

External links 
 

1996 births
Living people
Vietnamese female badminton players
21st-century Vietnamese women
Badminton players at the 2018 Asian Games
Asian Games competitors for Vietnam
Competitors at the 2013 Southeast Asian Games
Competitors at the 2015 Southeast Asian Games
Competitors at the 2017 Southeast Asian Games
Competitors at the 2019 Southeast Asian Games
Competitors at the 2021 Southeast Asian Games
Southeast Asian Games bronze medalists for Vietnam
Southeast Asian Games medalists in badminton